Space filling or spacefilling may refer to:

Space-filling curve
Space-filling model, in chemistry
Space-filling polyhedron
Space-filling tree
Space-filling bubble in a foam